Mesero is a comune (municipality) in the Metropolitan City of Milan in the Italian region Lombardy, located about  west of Milan.

Mesero borders the following municipalities: Inveruno, Cuggiono, Ossona, Marcallo con Casone, Bernate Ticino.

References

External links
 Official website

Cities and towns in Lombardy